Vilhenense Esportivo Clube, commonly referred to as Vilhenense, is a Brazilian football club based in Vilhena, Rondônia. The club competes in the Campeonato Rondoniense Série A, the top division in the Rondônia state football league system.

As of 2022, Vilhenense is the third-best ranked team from Rondônia in CBF's national club ranking, being placed 151st overall.

History
In October 2017, Vilhenense was founded by businessman Valdir Kurtz, with the intention of playing in the ensuing Campeonato Rondoniense. The club made their debut in the 2018 Rondoniense, finishing first in the first round but ending fourth overall; it also qualified for the 2019 Copa Verde, but refused to play in the competition.

In the 2019 Rondoniense, Vilhenense lifted the trophy after a 2–1 aggregate win over Ji-Paraná.

References

External links
 
Soccerway team profile

Football clubs in Rondônia
Association football clubs established in 2017
2017 establishments in Brazil